Tensei Jingo (天声人語, literally, the voice of heaven is the voice of people)  is the title of a column which appears on the front page of the Asahi Shimbun, a Japanese newspaper. It is a translation of the Latin phrase as Vox Populi, Vox Dei ("The voice of the people is the voice of the gods"). The column is limited to 607 Japanese characters.

History
The column first appeared in 1904 in the Osaka Asahi Shimbun. It was named by Nishimura Tenshu, the chief editor of Osaka Asahi Shimbun. The origin of the name is not clear, though it might be the translation of "Vox Populi, Vox Dei", or "the voice of the people is the voice of god". In 1913, the Tokyo Asahi Shimbun started a similar column named The  until the end of August 1940. On the next day, both offices of the Asahi Shimbun changed the name of the column to The  and then on January 1, 1943, The . On September 6, 1945, the title of the column returned to Tensei Jingo.

Characteristics
While appearing op-ed, the columns are actually written by professional newspaper reporters. The column often reflects on recent news, or other contemporary matters such as a change of seasons. It tends to find parallels or explanation in poetry, literature or folk customs. It may contradict the editorial opinion of the paper. Translations in English are published daily by the newspaper’s online team https://www.asahi.com/sp/ajw/ . 

Books containing the English translations are published for readers in Japan to practise their English. Special triangular “tenseijingo” pencils are sold in some stationery stores in Japan.

The column started under strong influence of English essay literature at the beginning of the 20th century.  The
Asahi Shimbun advertised that short essays in the Tensei Jingo were frequently cited in entrance examinations to universities. Recently, Tensei Jingo transcription note was published.

Writers
The writers were top journalists of the Asahi Shimbun at that time.
Ryuichi Kaji – Between September 1945 and April 1946
Hideo Aragaki – Between May 1946 and April 1963
Tokuro Irie – Between May 1963 and April 1970
Keiichiro Hikita – Between May 1970 and February 1973
Junro Fukaya – Between February 1973 and November 1975
Kazuo Tatsuno – Between December 1975 and August 1988
Kensaku Shirai – Between August 1988 and August 1995
Wataru Kurita – Between August 1995 and March 2001
Tamio Oike – Between April 2001 and March 2004
Ikuo Takahashi – Between April 2004 and March 2007
Shinji Fukushima – Started April 2007
Tadashi Tominaga – Started April 2007

Other Japanese newspapers

Other Japanese newspapers have similar columns, for instance Yomiuri Shimbun has a column (Henshū Techō, 編集手帳), Mainichi Shimbun has a column (Yoroku, 余録), Tokyo Shimbun has a column (Hissen, 筆洗) and Nihon Keizai Shimbun has a column (Shunjū, 春秋).

Footnotes

References
Akio Namekata Taishita Mondaija Naiga... English column masterpieces 2009, Iwanami Shoten,  p. 226
Asahi Shimbun featuring Tensei Jingo on February 4, 2012.

Asahi Shimbun Company
Mass media in Japan
Mass media in Osaka
1904 establishments in Japan
Publications established in 1904
Japanese language